Kerrisdale is a neighbourhood in the city of Vancouver, British Columbia, Canada.

Kerrisdale is a neighbourhood located in Vancouver's west side. It features a mix of newer houses and older bungalows as well as various low and mid-rise rental and condo apartment buildings in its northern section. The neighbourhood is an ethnic mix of Caucasian and Asian Canadians. It features a shopping district running generally along West 41st Avenue between Larch and Maple Streets and West Boulevard between 37th and 49th Avenues. Although the city officially defines Kerrisdale as being south of 41st Ave (north of 41st is called Arbutus Ridge), the majority of the area's residents consider the area's boundaries to be West 33rd Avenue to the north, Granville Street to the east, West 57th Avenue to the south, and Blenheim Street to the west. The northern part of Marpole is also generally thought of as part of Kerrisdale, thus some refer to the area as Kerrisdale-Marpole. The southwestern part of Kerrisdale is known as Southlands, due to its location in relation to the city. Southlands is known for its horse stables and rural feel and is located on the floodplain of the North Arm of the Fraser River.

History
Kerrisdale gained its name in 1905 when British Columbia Electric Railway manager R.H. Sterling asked Mrs. William McKinnon to name the interurban stop at Wilson Road (today West 41st Avenue). She chose to call it "Kerry's Dale", after the name of her family home, Kerrydale, in Gairloch, Scotland.  Kerrydale means "little seat of the fairies". It was quickly corrupted to Kerrisdale. The area was part of the Municipality of Point Grey, which amalgamated January 1, 1929 with the City of Vancouver and the Municipality of South Vancouver. Many of the streets and avenues surrounding this focal intersection developed around this time, with local landmarks such as Point Grey Secondary School, Ryerson Church, Shannon Mews and the Allen Brown Estate constructed in these formative years.

Demographics

As of the 2016 community census, there were 13,975 people, 5,530 private households, and 3,930 families residing in Kerrisdale.

Although formerly British in character and demographics, Kerrisdale began to experience an influx of affluent immigrants from Hong Kong in the mid-1980s. This was partially due to the fears of Communist China taking over Hong Kong from the British in 1997 per the Sino-British Joint Declaration. Many new immigrants constructed large, modern houses. Therefore, Kerrisdale is generally a mix of architecture, with older bungalows in between new houses and renovated houses.

Kerrisdale has a mix of professionals, wealthy people, and students renting basement suites or more inexpensive apartment blocks to attend nearby schools. The area is also home to elderly residents who primarily rent in the low rise rental blocks that characterize the north central section of the community.

Projected average 2008 household income: $131,769 as compared with $75,854 and $79,798 for Vancouver and Metro Vancouver respectively.

Services

The stretch of businesses along W. 41st Ave between Balsam and Maple streets comprise the Kerrisdale Business Association, the longest running such association in Vancouver. Member businesses pool funds for festivities and general beautification of the area, including the hiring of a full-time gardener during summer months.

The Arbutus Corridor, a no-longer-used CPR railway line which bisects the neighbourhood, has been purchased by the City of Vancouver and will be a series of community gardens, as well as a greenway for bicycles and pedestrians. The railway line has been removed and the right of way has been converted into a greenway for pedestrians and cyclists.

Kerrisdale Community Centre is home to the Kerrisdale Branch of the Vancouver Public Library, and Kerrisdale Pool.

North of 41st Avenue on East Boulevard is the Kerrisdale Cyclone Taylor Arena, built in 1949 as a hockey arena and was used as wrestling venue for 1954 British Empire and Commonwealth Games.

The Arbutus Greenway, a large path designed for bikers and pedestrians, runs North-South through the heart of Kerrisdale.

Education

Kerrisdale is home to Kerrisdale Elementary School, Kerrisdale Annex, Maple Grove Elementary School, Dr. R. E. McKechnie Elementary School, and Quilchena Elementary School, as well as Magee Secondary School, Prince of Wales Secondary School and Point Grey Secondary School.

Crofton House School, a private school for girls, is on the western edge of the neighbourhood, next to Dunbar-Southlands.

Further reading
 Majury, N. (1994). "Signs of the times: Kerrisdale, a neighbourhood in transition." The Canadian Geographer 38, 265-70.

Notes

References

External links
 City of Vancouver - Kerrisdale
 Vancouver Public Library - Kerrisdale Branch
 Kerrisdale Community Centre
 Footage of erection of the Kerrisdale Arena, City of Vancouver Archives
The Kerrisdale Bowladrome in 1959
 
 

Neighbourhoods in Vancouver
Streetcar suburbs